In the study of mathematics and especially differential geometry, fundamental vector fields are an instrument that describes the infinitesimal behaviour of a smooth Lie group action on a smooth manifold. Such vector fields find important applications in the study of Lie theory, symplectic geometry, and the study of Hamiltonian group actions.

Motivation

Important to applications in mathematics and physics is the notion of a flow on a manifold. More precisely, given  one is interested in curves  such that

for which local solutions are guaranteed by the Existence and Uniqueness Theorem of Ordinary Differential Equations.

Conversely, every smooth action  defines a complete vector field  via the equation
 

In the language of flow theory, the vector field  is called the infinitesimal generator. Intuitively, the behaviour of the flow at each point corresponds to the "direction" indicated by the vector field.

Definition
Let  be a Lie group with corresponding Lie algebra . Furthermore, let  be a smooth manifold endowed with a smooth action .

The map  can then be shown to be a Lie algebra homomorphism.

Applications

Lie groups
In fact, if we let  act on itself via right-multiplication, the corresponding fundamental vector fields are precisely the left-invariant vector fields.

Hamiltonian group actions

In the motivation, it was shown that there is a bijective correspondence between smooth  actions and complete vector fields. Similarly, there is a bijective correspondence between symplectic actions (the induced diffeomorphisms are all symplectomorphisms) and complete symplectic vector fields.

A closely related idea is that of Hamiltonian vector fields. Given a symplectic manifold , we say that  is a Hamiltonian vector field if there exists a smooth function  satisfying

where the map  is the interior product.
 

References

Lie groups
Symplectic geometry
Hamiltonian mechanics
Smooth manifolds